1991 is a year.

1991 may also refer to:
1991 (number)
1991 (film), a 2018 Canadian film
1991 (Lynyrd Skynyrd album), 1991
1991 (Izrael album), 1991
1991 (TopGunn album)
1991 (Azealia Banks EP), 2012
1991 (Babyland EP), 1991
"1991", a song by Tesla Boy from the album The Universe Made of Darkness, 2013